In Roman mythology, Orbona was the goddess who granted new children to parents who had become childless. She was also the goddess of children, especially orphans.

Early Roman mythology focused on the interlocking and complex interrelations between gods and humans. In this, the Romans maintained a large selection of divinities with unusually specific areas of authority. A sub-group of deities covered the general realm of infancy and childhood. In this area, Orbona was called upon as a general guardian and tutelary deity of children and orphans.

In Tony DiTerlizzi's children novel The Search for WondLa, Orbona is the name of the planet that serves as the setting for the story. The human girl, Eva Nine carries out a perilous search for others of her kind, accompanied by a caretaker robot and two friendly denizens of the planet. This relates to the goddess Orbona from Roman myths because she is an orphan of sorts, though accompanied by a robot she calls Muthr who has raised her in the underground Sanctuary, and she wanted to find others like her- like a parent who wants a child, or vice versa. 

In the HBO drama series, Rome, the goddess is mentioned as the Blessed Orbona by Lyde after she joins the temple.

References 

Childhood goddesses
Roman goddesses
Tutelary goddesses